Pier Luigi Simonetti (born 4 January 2001) is an Italian professional footballer who plays as a midfielder for  club Ancona-Matelica.

Club career
Born in Rome, Simonetti was formed as a player in Roma youth system.

On 17 September 2020, he joined Serie C club Piacenza. On 19 January 2022, his contract with Piacenza was terminated by mutual consent.

On 21 January 2022, he signed with Catania until the end of the 2021–22 season. On 9 April 2022, he was released together with all of his Catania teammates following the club's exclusion from Italian football due to its inability to overcome a number of financial issues.

On 14 June 2022, Simonetti signed with Ancona-Matelica.

Personal life
His sister Flaminia is also footballer.

References

External links
 

2001 births
Living people
Footballers from Rome
Italian footballers
Association football midfielders
Serie C players
A.S. Roma players
Piacenza Calcio 1919 players
Catania S.S.D. players
Ancona-Matelica players